The Border Sheriff is a 1926 American silent Western film directed by Robert N. Bradbury and starring Jack Hoxie, Olive Hasbrouck, and S.E. Jennings.

Cast
 Jack Hoxie as Sheriff Cultus Collins 
 Olive Hasbrouck as Joan Belden 
 S.E. Jennings as Carter Brace 
 Gilbert Holmes as Tate 'Tater-bug' Cooper 
 Buck Moulton as Limpy Peel 
 Thomas G. Lingham as Henry Belden 
 Bert De Marc as Joe Martinez 
 Frank Rice as Marsh Hewitt

References

External links

 
 

1926 films
1926 Western (genre) films
1920s English-language films
Universal Pictures films
Films directed by Robert N. Bradbury
American black-and-white films
Silent American Western (genre) films
1920s American films